Russell Harry Fry (born 4 December 1985) is an English footballer who plays for North Ferriby United as a midfielder.

Club career
Born in Hull, East Riding of Yorkshire, Fry came through Hull City's youth system. He made his first team debut as an 81st minute substitute for Scott Kerr in a 3–1 defeat at Port Vale in the Football League Trophy first round Northern section on 22 October 2002. He signed his first professional contract with Hull on 16 December. His league debut against Brentford in the final game of the 2004–05 season lasted only 32 minutes until he had to leave the pitch with an injury. He signed a new two-year contract with Hull in August 2005. Fry joined Conference National side Halifax Town on a one-month loan on 24 August 2006. This loan ended on 25 September Halifax allowed him to return to Hull, having made four appearances for the club. He joined Conference North side Hinckley United on loan in October 2006 and he finished the loan with nine appearances and one goal.

Fry was released by Hull in May 2007 and after trialling with newly-relegated League One club Leeds United during the summer he signed non-contract terms with Halifax on 9 August. He was an unused substitute in their first two games of the season before signing for Conference North club Boston United on non-contract terms later in August.

After being an unused substitute for Boston he opted to a move to Conference Premier team York City on non-contract terms, in pursuit of a permanent deal, on 15 September. He eventually signed a permanent contract at the club on 27 September. He joined Northern Premier League Premier Division team North Ferriby United on loan in November 2007. He made a scoring debut after netting the winning goal in the 45th minute of a 1–0 victory over Eastwood Town on 24 November. He returned to York after the loan concluded in January 2008, having made 11 appearances and scored 3 goals for Ferriby. His first start for York came playing as a wingback in a 2–0 victory at Farsley Celtic in the FA Trophy third round on 3 February. This was followed by a second successive start in a 3–3 draw after extra time with Northwich Victoria in the Conference League Cup fifth round Northern section on 6 February, which York lost 3–2 in a penalty shoot-out, although he was substituted in the 52nd minute.

Fry was released by York with immediate effect on 15 February 2008 allowing him to join North Ferriby permanently. He was nominated as a candidate for the Player of the Round award for the 2010–11 FA Cup third qualifying round for his performance against Vauxhall Motors, but eventually missed out to Justin Marsden of Nuneaton Town.
North Ferriby were promoted to The Conference North League at the end of the 2012–13 season and narrowly missed out on a second successive promotion at the end of 2013–14 season.
Fry received a special achievement award with North Ferriby after reaching 300 appearances during the 2013–14 season.
Fry was part of the 2015 squad that took North Ferriby Utd to Wembley for the FA Trophy Final against Wrexham, in which North Ferriby won 5–4 on penalties to lift the Trophy in front of nearly 15,000 spectators.

International career
Fry was named in the Wales national under-15 team for a game against Northern Ireland in November 2000. He later played for the under-16s before representing England at under-20 level, making his debut as a half-time substitute in a 4–0 defeat to Russia in a friendly on 16 August 2005.

Career statistics

Honours
North Ferriby United
FA Trophy: 2014–15

References

External links

Russell Fry profile at the official North Ferriby United A.F.C. website

1985 births
Living people
Footballers from Kingston upon Hull
English footballers
England youth international footballers
Welsh footballers
Wales youth international footballers
Association football midfielders
Hull City A.F.C. players
Halifax Town A.F.C. players
Hinckley United F.C. players
Boston United F.C. players
York City F.C. players
North Ferriby United A.F.C. players
English Football League players
National League (English football) players
Northern Premier League players